USS Hebe (SP-966) was a United States Navy patrol vessel in commission from 1917 to 1918.

Hebe was built as a private motorboat of the same name in 1912 by George Bishop at Patchogue on Long Island, New York. On 19 May 1917, the U.S. Navy leased her from her owner, Edwin Thome of New York City, for use as a section patrol boat during World War I. She was commissioned at the New York Navy Yard in Brooklyn, New York, as USS Hebe (SP-966) on 1 August 1917.

Assigned to the 3rd Naval District and based at Sayville, New York, Hebe patrolled the Great South Bay and Fire Island region of southern Long Island through the end of World War I.

Hebe was returned to Thome on 14 December 1918.

References

SP-966 Hebe at Department of the Navy Naval History and Heritage Command Online Library of Selected Images: U.S. Navy Ships -- Listed by Hull Number "SP" #s and "ID" #s -- World War I Era Patrol Vessels and other Acquired Ships and Craft numbered from SP-900 through SP-999
NavSource Online: Section Patrol Craft Photo Archive Hebe (SP 966)

Patrol vessels of the United States Navy
World War I patrol vessels of the United States
Ships built in New York (state)
1912 ships